

People
Blacker can refer to the following people:

 Ann Thetis Blacker (1927–2006), British painter and singer
 Cpt Dr Carlos Blacker MC GM FRCP ("C.P. Blacker", 1895–1975), British war hero, psychiatrist and eugenicist
 Carmen Blacker FBA (1924–2009), British scholar of the Japanese language, daughter of Dr Carlos Blacker
 General Sir Cecil Blacker GCB OBE MC (1916–2002), British soldier and Adjutant-General to the Forces, father of Terence Blacker, great-grandson of Lt Col William Blacker
 Charles Blacker Vignoles (1793–1875), British railway engineer, eponym of the Vignoles flat-bottomed rail
 Dr Coit D. Blacker, 20th- and 21st-century American academic in international studies, Special Assistant for National Security Affairs to President Clinton
 David Blacker, 21st-century Sri Lankan Burgher author and creative director in advertising
 George Blacker (antiquary) (1791–1871), Irish clergyman and antiquary
 Sir George Blacker (obstetrician) CBE FRCP FRCS (1865–1948), British–Irish obstetrician
 Mr Justice Harold Blacker (1889–1944), judge in British India
 General Sir Jeremy Blacker KCB CBE (1939–2005), British soldier, Master-General of the Ordnance
 Jesse Blacker (born 1991), a Canadian professional ice hockey defenceman, playing for the Texas Stars of the American Hockey League
 Jim Blacker (born 1945), British professional footballer for Bradford City
 Kate Blacker (born 1955), British artist
 Maxwell Blacker (1822–1888), English cricketer
 Peter Blacker (born 1941), Australian Nationals politician in South Australia
 Robert R. Blacker (1845–1931), American lumberman, for whom the Manistee County Airport and Robert R. Blacker House are named
 Sarah Blacker (born 1983), American singer-songwriter
 Lt Col Stewart Blacker OBE (1887–1964), British soldier and inventor of several anti-tank weapons
 Terence Blacker (born 1948), British author and columnist, son of Cecil Blacker
 Lt Col Valentine Blacker CB (1778–1826), British East India Company soldier and Surveyor General of India
 Lt Col William Blacker (1777–1855), British soldier and Commissioner of the Treasury of Ireland, an original member of the Orange Institution; great-grandfather of Cecil Blacker
 William Blacker (angler), 19th-century British angler, author of Blacker's Art of Fly Making
 William Blacker (politician) (1843–1913), Australian Liberal politician in South Australia
 Anthony Blacker Elliott (1887–1970), British–Irish clergyman, bishop in South India

Other 
Blacker can refer to the following things:

 Blacker (security), a U.S. Department of Defense computer network security project
 a slang term for an encryption device; see red/black concept
 Blacker (Transformers), a fictional character from the 1989 anime series Transformers: Victory
 Blacker's Art of Fly Making, an 1842 book on angling by William Blacker
 Blacker Bombard, a World War II-era British anti-tank weapon invented by Lt Col Stewart Blacker
 Blacker House at the California Institute of Technology
 Manistee County Blacker Airport (IATA: MBL, ICAO: KMBL), serving the American town of Manistee, Michigan, named for Robert R. Blacker
 Robert R. Blacker House, a 1907 residence in Pasadena, California, listed on the U.S. National Register of Historic Places in 1986